Stop at Nothing is a 1924 American silent drama film directed by Charles R. Seeling and starring George Larkin, Ollie Kirby and Otto Metzetti.

Cast
 George Larkin as Jim Perry/Shadow Brice
 Ollie Kirby as Slick Sadie
 Otto Metzetti as Burly Walters
 Victor Metzetti as Jack Newton
 Kenneth Green as Secretary

References

Bibliography
 Robert B. Connelly. The Silents: Silent Feature Films, 1910-36, Volume 40, Issue 2. December Press, 1998.

External links
 

1924 films
1924 drama films
1920s English-language films
American silent feature films
Silent American drama films
American black-and-white films
Films directed by Charles R. Seeling
1920s American films